Avior Airlines C.A. (legally Aviones de Oriente C.A.) is an airline based in Barcelona, Anzoátegui, Venezuela. It operates scheduled and charter services within Venezuela and the southern Caribbean out of its main hub at Generál José Antonio Anzoátegui International Airport. It is currently the largest private capital airline in Venezuela in terms of fleet, destinations and its more than 1800 employees nationally and internationally.

History

Founded by Jorge Luis Añez Dager and Rafael Ciarcia Walo, the airline was established as Avior Express, and started operations on June 30, 1995, initially using a single five-seat Cessna Skymaster for charter flights to Margarita Island and Canaima. Actually, It is totally owned by Jorge Añez Dager.

In 2009, Avior Airlines had entered a bankruptcy crisis, for which most of its destinations were suspended, and their 12 Beechcraft 1900D left the fleet. During the following years, Avior Airlines comes out of the crisis and began to resurface.

For 2012, Avior Airlines announced the creation of a new subsidiary named Avior Regional, that would cover the old routes suspended in 2009, as well as the purchase of 4 Boeing 737-400s for international flights. In 2013, the first of them arrived and also the first Fokker 50 of Avior Regional, but due to problems with the National Institute of Civil Aeronautics for the certification of the new airline, it was decided to operate the Fokker 50 while the new airline, thus reopening the destinations of Valera and Mérida until mid-2015, when they became part of Avior Regional's fleet.

Since 2015, Avior had started an ambitious process of expanding its fleet and destinations, with the aim of encouraging Venezuelan air connectivity, as a result of the reduction of flights from foreign airlines to the country, it is currently the Venezuelan airline with the greater number of destinations outside of Venezuelan territory.

On December 3, 2017, Avior was added to the list of airlines banned in the European Union, due to failing to meet their safety requirements.

In December 2018, the company received the IOSA certification, which recognizes the operational processes and control systems of the airlines in terms of their safety. This means that Avior Airlines becomes part of a select community of airlines around the world with recognized prestige and trust, which opens up new frontiers such as the possibility of operating directly to Europe and other continents under internationally recognized operational standards.

Destinations

As of April 2022, Avior Airlines flies to the following destinations:

Fleet

Current fleet

, the Avior Airlines fleet includes the following aircraft:

Former fleet
Avior Airlines formerly operated the following aircraft:

AviorPlus
Avior Plus is Avior's exclusive frequent flyer program that accumulate air miles each time that they fly. These miles can then be spent to upgrade or purchase future flights on Avior Airlines.

There are 3 levels of membership, all with varying degrees of benefits:
Silver
Gold
Black

Accidents and incidents
On July 15, 1998, a Beechcraft 1900D was hijacked by four armed masked hijackers during a domestic flight. The hijackers were among 22 people on board the aircraft, which was flying from Caracas to Barinas. The hijackers forced the plane to divert to a remote airstrip at a cattle ranch. The hijackers released the passengers and crew, and took the plane to Colombia, where it was later recovered.
On July 30, 1999, another Beechcraft 1900D (registered YV-466C) was hijacked, this time by three men and two women. The aircraft was flying from Caracas to Guasdualito, via Barinas. Coordinates were given to the flight crew and landed the plane in Arauca, Colombia.
On January 7, 2009, a Boeing 737-200 (registered YV1360), flying from Oranjestad to Valencia, made an emergency landing after an engine fire was reported. The aircraft diverted to Simón Bolívar International Airport where the aircraft landed safely. All 81 occupants on board were uninjured.
On October 31, 2014, a Boeing 737-400 (registered YV2946) suffered a tire burst during takeoff at General José Antonio Anzoátegui International Airport. The flight crew aborted the takeoff and the aircraft stopped with a burst and deflated tire on the left hand main landing gear. None of the 144 occupants on board were injured.
On March 3, 2018, a Boeing 737-400 flying from Barcelona to Guayaquil ran off the runway during landing at José Joaquín de Olmedo International Airport. No injuries were reported and apparently the aircraft did not suffered no structural damage. The causes of this inconvenience were mainly due to the wet track and the heavy rain that fell in the city.
On November 22, 2019, a Boeing 737-400 (registered YV3012) was servicing a flight between Valencia and Bogotá. Upon landing at El Dorado International Airport, its right main landing gear suffered a serious malfunction causing it to collapse, which lead to an evacuation once the aircraft came to a halt.
On December 6, 2019, a Boeing 737-400 (registered YV3011) took off at 8AM flying from Lima to Caracas when it suffered a depressurization 45 minutes after takeoff. There were 133 passengers and 8 crew members on board. Some passengers suffered a lack of oxygen, including a six-month-old child. The aircraft had to make a sharp descent landing emergency in the city of Tarapoto, Peru. The airline enabled an aircraft to comply with the scheduled itinerary.

See also
List of airlines of Venezuela
List of airlines banned in the European Union

References

External links

Official website

Airlines banned in the European Union
Airlines of Venezuela
Airlines established in 1994
Venezuelan companies established in 1994
Venezuelan brands